Dijamant is a Serbian edible oil manufacturing company headquartered in Zrenjanin. It is owned by the Fortenova Group.

History
The company was established in 1938 as Oil Factory "Beograd", based in Zrenjanin. Following World War II, in 1946, the company became a government-owned enterprise named "2. oktobar".

1974 A new bottling plant was built with a line for filling oil in PVC bottles.

In 2005, the Croatian conglomerate Agrokor Group became the majority shareholder of Dijamant. With the purchase, Agrokor came to own two large edible oil manufacturers, "Zvijezda d.d. Zagreb" in Croatia and "Dijamant a.d. Zrenjanin" in Serbia.

In 2021, by the decision of APR, the transfer of Agrokor's share in the Dijamant company to the Fortenova Group was registered, which made the Fortenova Group the only owner of the company with a 100% of share.

The decision to change the legal form of the company from a joint stock company to a limited liability company was made on August 23, 2021. year, and the decision was registered by the Decision of the APR on August, 26, 2021. yr.

References

External links
 

1938 establishments in Yugoslavia
2015 mergers and acquisitions
Agrokor
Companies based in Zrenjanin
Food and drink companies established in 1938
Food and drink companies of Serbia
Serbian brands